Hye-rim, also spelled Hye-lim, is a Korean feminine given name. Its meaning differs based on the hanja used to write each syllable of the name. There are 16 hanja with the reading "hye" and nine hanja with the reading "rim" on the South Korean government's official list of hanja which may be registered for use in given names.

People with this name include:
Song Hye-rim (1937–2002), North Korean actress, former mistress of Kim Jong-il
Kim Hye-lim (born 1985), South Korean sabre fencer
Hye-rim Park (born 1985), South Korean-born American model
Jung Hye-lim (born 1987), South Korean hurdler
Kristie Ahn (Korean name Ahn Hyerim, born 1992), American tennis player of Korean descent
Woo Hye-rim (born 1992), South Korean singer, member of Wonder Girls
Jung Eun-ji (born Jung Hye-rim, 1993), South Korean actress and singer, member of A Pink
Lime (Korean singer) (born Kim Hye-lim, 1993), South Korean singer, member of Hello Venus
Hye Rim Lee, South Korean-born New Zealand artist

See also
List of Korean given names

References

Korean feminine given names